John Oldham (June 22, 1923 – November 23, 2020) was an American college and professional basketball player, college basketball coach and athletic director.  Oldham interrupted his studies at Western Kentucky University (WKU) to serve in the US Navy during World War II.   He was on the university's basketball team and after graduation in 1949 played for the Fort Wayne Pistons.  Oldham went into coaching in 1952 at College High School in Bowling Green, Kentucky.  In 1955 he became coach of the Tennessee Tech Golden Eagles men's basketball and led the team to three conference championships.  He returned to WKU in 1964 to coach the Western Kentucky Hilltoppers basketball team, leading them to four NCAA tournaments, one NIT, and winning four Ohio Valley Conference (OVC) championships.  In 1971 Oldham was promoted to  athletic director at WKU, a position he held until 1986.  During his tenure the university won six OVC and one Sun Belt Conference All-Sports Championship.  After retirement he was elected to the Bowling Green City Commission.

Career

Oldham came to Western Kentucky University in 1942 after earning All-State honors at Hartford High School.  In 1943 he left college to serve in the United States Navy during World War II.  He returned to the college in 1946, graduating in 1949.  The teams he played on at Western were nationally ranked, participated in three National Invitation Tournaments, including a 3rd-place finish in 1948, won three KIAC titles, one SIAA championship, and the first Ohio Valley Conference title.  He was a United Press and Associated Press All-American in 1949. After college, he played for the Fort Wayne Pistons of the National Basketball Association.

In 1952 he began his coaching career at College High School in Bowling Green, KY.  In his first year as coach, he led the boys' basketball team to the state tournament.

Oldham was hired to coach Tennessee Tech Golden Eagles men's basketball in 1955.  He led the school to three conference championships and its first two appearances in the NCAA tournament.  Oldham returned to coach his alma mater, the Western Kentucky Hilltoppers, in 1964, taking over for his former coach Edgar Diddle who retired after 42 years at the school. In seven seasons, he finished 146–41 with a 78% winning percentage, leading them to four NCAA tournaments and an NIT berth while winning five Ohio Valley Conference championships.  He led the Hilltoppers to the 1971 NCAA tournament to the Final Four and finished third overall. Their third-place finish was later vacated by the NCAA due to allegations that one of their players, Jim McDaniels, had signed a professional contract prior to the end of the season. He was named Ohio Valley Conference coach of the year four times.

In 1971 Oldham was named Athletic Director for WKU, and served in that position until his retirement in 1986.  During his tenure as AD, WKU won six OVC All-Sports Championships and one Sun Belt Conference All-Sports Championship. He oversaw the football program upgrading from NCAA Division 2 to Division 1AA in 1978, the school leaving the OVC and joining the Sun Belt Conference in 1982, and the Western Kentucky Lady Toppers basketball team becoming one of the top programs in the country.  He also hired the school's first African American Head Coach, Clem Haskins as men's basketball coach, in 1980.  He has been inducted into the Lions Club Kentucky High School Hall of Fame (1969), Kentucky Athletic Hall of Fame (1986), Ohio Valley Conference Hall of Fame (1989), Kentucky High School Hall of Fame (1990), Tennessee Tech Sports Hall of Fame (1990) and WKU Athletic Hall of Fame (1991).

In 1991 Oldham was elected to the Bowling Green City Commission and was re-elected twice, serving as Commissioner through December 1998.

Oldham died at Bowling Green on November 23, 2020 at the age of 97.  He was due to be buried in the city's Fairview Cemetery with military honours on November 30.

Cultural impact
The 1971 Western Kentucky Hilltoppers NCAA Final-4 basketball team was the first non-historically black Kentucky collegiate basketball team to start five African-American players. Coach Oldham started Clarence Glover, Jim McDaniels,  Jim Rose, Jerry Dunn and Rex Bailey. Oldham was pressured not to start all five together, but said "they are my best five players."

The concept of WKU's Red Towel athletics logo was developed by John Oldham in 1971, based on Ed Diddle's use of a red towel while coaching games.

In 1980 Oldham hired the first African-American head coach in school history, when he named Clem Haskins basketball coach.

On December 27, 2012, WKU honored Oldham in a pregame ceremony in which the court at EA Diddle Arena was named "John Oldham Court." Oldham was a player, basketball coach, and athletic director during his time at WKU.

Head coaching record

* 1971 NCAA Tournament participation later vacated by the NCAA

See also
 List of NCAA Division I Men's Final Four appearances by coach

References

External links
Western Kentucky profile

1923 births
2020 deaths
All-American college men's basketball players
American men's basketball coaches
American men's basketball players
Basketball coaches from Kentucky
Basketball players from Kentucky
Fort Wayne Pistons draft picks
Fort Wayne Pistons players
Guards (basketball)
High school basketball coaches in the United States
Kentucky city council members
Military personnel from Kentucky
People from Beaver Dam, Kentucky
People from Hartford, Kentucky
Sportspeople from Bowling Green, Kentucky
Tennessee Tech Golden Eagles men's basketball coaches
Western Kentucky Hilltoppers and Lady Toppers athletic directors
Western Kentucky Hilltoppers basketball coaches
Western Kentucky Hilltoppers basketball players
United States Navy personnel of World War II